Vitaly Borisovich Linetsky (October 22, 1971 - July 16, 2014) was a Ukrainian theater and film actor, Honored Artist of Ukraine (2004).

Biography 

Born on October 22, 1971, in Ivano-Frankivsk. Graduated from the Kyev National University of Theatre, Film and Television named after Karpenko-Kary.
He served as an actor in the Ivano-Frankivsk Ukrainian Drama Theatre, the Kiev Youth Theater and the Kiev Academic Drama and Comedy Theater on the left bank of the Dnieper.
Twice winner of the professional theater award "Kyiv Pectoral": in 1998 - in the nomination "Best Actor in a Supporting Role" for the role of Senor Meis in the play "A Little Wine ... or 70 Revolutions" based on novels by L. Pirandello, in 2007 - in the nomination " Best Actor in the First Plan" for the role of Yegor Voynitsky in the play "26 Rooms ..." based on A. Chekhov's play "Leshy".

Actively acted in films.

He died at six o'clock in the morning on July 16, 2014, in Kyiv. The director of the Theater on the Left Bank, Alexander Gannochenko, said that the actor fell and hit his head, the same version was confirmed by journalist Maxim Ravreba: “Two days ago he was last seen at Kurenevka. Then the wife was called for identification. Vitaly was found dead in an underground passage along Teligi Street, near St. Cyril's Church. Or killed, or fell from a great height onto concrete steps. But it was an unnatural death." A criminal case was opened on the fact of the death of the actor, but no signs of violent death were found on his body: “A witness, a saleswoman at a round-the-clock stall, saw a man on July 16 at six in the morning sit down on the parapet that encloses the stairs to the underground passage and accidentally fall down , rolling down the stairs. The fact that the man was alone at that time was also recorded by a video camera installed nearby.
Farewell to V. B. Linetsky took place on 21 at the Theater on the Left Bank. The actor is buried at the Berkovets cemetery.

Theatrical work

Kyiv Academic Theatre of Drama and Comedy on the left bank of Dnieper 

1995 - "The Invincible Sword Guyana" based on the fairy tale by T. Gabbe "City of Masters" - Moucheron the Younger
1995 - "The Sorceress" by I. Karpenko-Kary - Demyan

1995 - "Anything, or Twelfth Night" by W. Shakespeare - Feste / Death

1996 - "Fool" M. Ashara - Miguel Ostos

1996 - "Comedy about the charm of sin" based on the play by N. Machiavelli "Mandrake"; dir. Yuri Lonely - Ligurio

1996 - "A little wine ... or 70 turns" based on short stories by L. Pirandello - Senor Meis

1997 - "Small demon" F. Sologub; dir. Yuri Lonely - Pavlusha Volodin

1997 - "Deceived" T. Manna - doctor

1998 - "The Moor of Venice" ("Othello") by W. Shakespeare - Iago

1998 - "Philoctetes-concert" according to Sophocles - Neoptolem

1999 - "So the summer ended ..." based on the novel by I. Shaw "Lucy Crown" - Jeff

2000 - "The Death of Tarelkin" by A. Sukhovo-Kobylin - Rasplyuev, Krestyan Krestyanovich

2001 - “Who is afraid? ..” based on the play by E. Albee - Nick

2003 - "Sea, night, candles" based on the play by Y. Bar-Yosef "This is a great sea" - Noah Greenwald

2006 - "26 rooms ..." based on the play by A. Chekhov "Leshy" - Egor Petrovich Voynitsky

2006 - "My dears! .." based on the works of F. Dostoevsky and A. Volodin - Kerilashvili / Svidrigailov

2008 - "Let him not love two at once ..." based on the play by M. Staritsky "Oh, don't go, Gritsu ..." - Khoma

2012 - "Carnival of the Flesh" based on the play by G. Buchner "Woyzeck" - Woyzeck

2014 - "Fun from the heart, or a cap with crucians" based on the stories of Y. Koval; dir. Dmitry Bogomazov — Author

Theater "Free Stage" 
2003 - "Roberto Zucco" B.-M. Coltesa - Roberto Zucco

Center for theatrical arts. Lesya Kurbasa 
2006 - "Notes of a Madman" by N. Gogol - Aksenty Ivanovich Poprishchin

Filmography 

1992 - Melodrama with attempted murder

1992 - Dandelion Blossom - episode

1999 - Bourgeois's birthday - Oleg Pozharsky

2001 - Birthday of Bourgeois-2 - Oleg Pozharsky

2001 - Trail of the werewolf

2001 - Evenings on a farm near Dikanka - Dyak

2002 - Gold Rush

2002 - Cinderella - Doctor

2003 - Crazy Day or The Marriage of Figaro - Basil

2004 - Coffeeman

2004 - Guide

2005 - Second Front

2005 - Special Purpose Girlfriend

2005 - Stolen happiness

2005 - Barbie's wedding

2006 - Happy People

2006 - Three nights (Lawyer)

2007 - I love you to death

2007 - Extraterrestrial - ufologist

2007 - Curator

2007 - If you hear me

2007 - Presumption of guilt

2007 - Thirst for extreme

2007 - Kill the snake

2008 - Illusion of fear

2008 - Detachment

2008 - Climber

2008 - Casting

2008 - Genius of empty space

2008 - Subscriber is temporarily unavailable

2009 - Governess - Alexei, Nina's former friend

2009 - Little Red Riding Hood - Storyteller, Brother Grimm

2009 - Razluchnitsa - Zhora, doctor, colleague and friend of Valery

2009 - To hell with two - bandit

2009 - The third is not given

2009 - Good reason for murder

2009 - Witching love-2

2010 - Brother for brother

2010 - The True Story of Scarlet Sails - Sincrite

2010 - Do you play chess?

2010 - I won't give you to anyone

2011 - Lovers in Kyiv (short story "Something") - Ivan

2011 - Kostoprav - Valentin Lvovich Fishman, plastic surgeon

2011 - The one who went through the fire - Stepan Shulika

2012 - Eternal return - He

2012 - Odesa-mother - Elagin, police captain

2014 - Migratory birds - Mikhail Vitalievich Serov, doctor

2014 - Crime in focus - Vadim Brigov, investigator

2015 - Battle for Sevastopol - KMB Major

2016 - Turtle Dove's Nest - Dmitry

References 

Kyiv National I. K. Karpenko-Kary Theatre, Cinema and Television University alumni
Recipients of the title of Merited Artist of Ukraine
21st-century Ukrainian male actors
20th-century Ukrainian male actors
Ukrainian male stage actors
2014 deaths
1971 births
Actors from Ivano-Frankivsk
Ukrainian male film actors